St. Francis Xavier School, Burgos (La Merced y San Francisco Javier) in northwest Spain was founded by the Jesuits in 1956. It covers pre-kindergarten through baccalaureate and includes a technical training division.

Vocational Training includes academic degrees in Administration, Commerce and Marketing, Carpentry and Furniture, Computer Science and Electricity – Electronics in Middle Degree, Higher Degree or Basic FP, according to specialties.

See also
 List of Jesuit sites

References  

Jesuit secondary schools in Spain
Catholic schools in Spain
Educational institutions established in 1956
1956 establishments in Spain